Hecheng District is the only urban district of the prefecture-level city of Huaihua, Hunan Province, China.

Located in central Huaihua, Hecheng District is bordered to the northwest by Mayang County, to the northeast by Chenxi County, to the east and the south by Zhongfang County, to the west by Zhijiang County. As of 2015, It had a registered population of 381,053 and a resident population of 607,900. Hecheng District has seven subdistricts, a town and two townships under its jurisdiction, the government seat is Tuoyuan.

References
www.xzqh.org

External links 

 
County-level divisions of Hunan
Huaihua